Alboglossiphonia heteroclita is a species of leeches belonging to the family Glossiphoniidae.

It has cosmopolitan distribution.

Synonym:
 Glossiphonia heteroclita (Linnaeus, 1761)

References

Leeches